Few-fruited sedge is a common name for several plants and may refer to:

Carex oligocarpa, native to North America
Carex oligosperma